Bis(trifluoromethyl)peroxide (BTP) is a fluorocarbon derivative first produced by Frédéric Swarts. It has recently been discovered that it is a good initiator for the polymerization of unsaturated ethylene-like molecules. It produces good quality polymers which are quite stable. This property is the reason an economical synthesis is sought for BTP. This chemical is unusual in the fact that unlike many peroxides, bis(trifluoromethyl)peroxide is a gas,  is nonexplosive and has good thermal stability.

History
Bis(trifluoromethyl)peroxide was first created in trace elements by an electrolysis reaction using aqueous solutions containing trifluoroacetate ion. This was one of the byproducts Frédéric Swarts got when performing trifluoromethylation reactions.[1] Later it was discovered that Bis(trifluoromethyl)peroxide had some unusual properties. This began a search for a more economical production of Bis(trifluoromethyl)peroxide. This was at first done by Porter and Cady. This reaction had a conversion rate of around  20-30% at normal pressure. They increased the conversion using an autoclave. This increased the yield to around 90% which helped procuring the chemical.

Synthesis and reaction
Present methods of the synthesis of bis(trifluoromethyl)peroxide involves the reaction of carbonyl fluoride and chlorine trifluoride at 0-300 °C.
An example of this reaction is the reaction of carbonyl fluoride and chlorine trifluoride in the presence of akali metal fluorides or bifluorides at 100-250 °C. This example is quite insensitive to variations in temperature.
Examples of the synthesis are:

2CF2O + ClF3 → CF3OOCF3 + ClF

6CF2O + 2ClF3 → 3CF3OOCF3 + Cl2

Bis(trifluoromethyl)peroxide can be isolated and purified by well-recognised procedures. In the mixture used to synthesize the compound chlorine monofluoride and chlorine trifluoride may still be present. These compounds are highly reactive and hazardous and are preferably deactivated as soon as possible. The deactivation is carried out by adding anhydrous calcium chloride to the mixture. The deactivated mixture is scrubbed with water and diluted caustically to remove the chlorine and residual carbonyl. The remaining if dried to complete the purification of bis(trifluoromethyl)peroxide.

Distribution
Bis(trifluoromethyl)peroxide is originally a gas, therefore this compound may be inhaled and distributed by the bloodstream. This distribution causes BTP to reach the organs. In the organs, the compound can enter the cells via the cell membrane. This is validated by the Lipinski's rule of five:

The molecular weight of the compound is less than 500 Da (170 Da).
The logP is less than 5 (2.65).
The compound has less than 5 H-bond donors (0).
The compound has less than 10 H-bond acceptors (2).

Metabolism

In mammals there are pathways for the metabolism of peroxides. These pathways make use of different enzymes, but of the same sort, peroxidases. The phase 1 metabolism of peroxides is an overall peroxidase-catalyzed reaction. For bis(trifluoromethyl)peroxide this will be the following  reaction:

Peroxidase + C2F6O2 → 2CF3O−

The peroxidase will then undergo two sequential electron transfers to come back into its beginning form.

Hepatoxicity
Simulation of the toxicity of Bis(trifluoromethyl)peroxide has shown that organic peroxides can cause peripheral and centrilobular zonal hepatic necrosis, increased liver weight and hepatic enzymes and fatty changes in hepatocytes. This occurs in both humans and experimental animals. The toxicity of peroxides is thought to be caused by the formation of reactive oxygen species (ROS) which are involved in lipid peroxidation further oxidative cellular damage.

Organic peroxides are often industrially used as oxidising agents. Exposure to such agents, for instance in the reported case of humans that were exposed to methyl ethyl ketone peroxide (MEKP), has been shown to cause peripheral zonal necrosis, increased hepatic enzyme levels and atypical pseudo-ductular proliferation at doses between 50 and 100 mL.

Past animal studies have shown good correlations between organic peroxide damage in human case reports and test animals. 28-day repeat- dose studies of 1,1-bis (tert-butyldioxy)-3,3,5-trimethylcyclohexane and dicumyl peroxide [MHLW 2001a and b] in rats showed liver weight increase, periportal fatty changes and centrilobular hypertrophy of hepatocytes.

A proposed mechanism for the toxicity of organic peroxides involves damage via formation of ROS, which is mediated by cytochrome P450. This then leads to lipid peroxidation of the membranes of the hepatocytes, alkylation of cellular macromolecules (reduced glutathione, altered calcium homeostasis. Identification of carboxyl, peroxyl, hydroxyl and alkoxyl radicals in rest rats give plausibility to the involvement of an oxidative system.

Nephrotoxicity

28 Day oral rat repeat dose studies with organic peroxides have shown alterations in rat kidneys in the form of histopathologic lesions. Further research of how this relates to bis(trifluoromethyl)peroxide is needed to draw conclusions from this, however.

See also
List of highly toxic gases
Bis(trifluoromethyl) disulfide

References

Organic peroxides
Trifluoromethyl compounds
Gases